Gunderi  is a village in the southern state of Karnataka, India. It is located in the Holalkere taluk of Chitradurga district in Karnataka.

Nearest districts to Gunderi 
Gunderi is located around 35 km away from its district headquarters of Chitradurga. The other nearest district headquarters is Davanagere situated at 58 km distance from Gunderi. Surrounding districts from Gunderi are as follows:
 Davanagere district	58 km.
 Shimoga district	75 km.
 Hassan district	110 km.
 Chikmagalur district	116 km.

Transport
The nearest railway station to Gunderi is Holalkere which is  around 6.5 km away. 
Other nearby stations include:

 Ramgiri railway station	6.8 km.
 Chikjajur Jn railway station	15.2 km.
 Hosdurga Road railway station	23.6 km.
 Shivani railway station	24.0 km.

Villages in Chitradurga district